David Kelly (born February 4, 1955) is a sailor from United States Virgin Islands. Kelly represented his country at the 1972 Summer Olympics in Kiel. Kelly took 24th place in the Soling with Dick Holmberg as helmsman and David Jones as fellow crew member.

References

External links
 
 
 

1955 births
Living people
United States Virgin Islands male sailors (sport)
American male sailors (sport)
Olympic sailors of the United States Virgin Islands
Sailors at the 1972 Summer Olympics – Soling